Susana Aurora Magallón Puebla is a Mexican biologist and scientist. Her research areas are evolutionary biology and bioinformatics, mainly focused on plant evolution. ​ In 2019 she was appointed director of the UNAM Institute of Biology for the period 2019–2023. In 2022, she was named a fellow of the American Academy of Arts and Sciences.

She graduated from National Autonomous University of Mexico, and  University of Chicago .

She is editor of New Phytologist

References 

Mexican biologists
National Autonomous University of Mexico alumni
University of Chicago alumni
Living people
Year of birth missing (living people)

Women bioinformaticians
Fellows of the American Academy of Arts and Sciences
Mexican women editors